This article contains information about the literary events and publications of 1731.

Events
January 1 – The Gentleman's Magazine: or, Trader's monthly intelligencer is launched by Edward Cave in London.
July – Alexander Pope completes the original writing of his poem An Essay on Man with the first two "Epistles: Of the Nature and State of Man, with Respect to" (1) "The Universe" and (2) "Himself as an Individual". The third and fourth will ensue in 1733 and 1734.
July 1 – Benjamin Franklin and fellow subscribers start the Library Company of Philadelphia.
August 20 – The Hollandsche Spectator is launched by Justus van Effen in Amsterdam.
October 23 – A fire at Ashburnham House in London damages the nationally owned Cotton Library, housed there at the time. The librarian, Dr Bentley, leaps from a window with the priceless Codex Alexandrinus under one arm. The original manuscripts of Asser's Life of King Alfred (9th century) and The Battle of Maldon (Old English) are destroyed; so largely is the 5th-century Cotton Genesis; and the Chronicon Æthelweardi is badly damaged; but the unique manuscript of Beowulf is damaged but saved.
December 11 – Bishop Thomas Tanner's valuable collection of books, on its way from Norwich to his new home at Oxford by barge, is damaged when the barge sinks at Wallingford.
unknown dates
The life and revelations of the Austrian Beguine Agnes Blannbekin (died 1315) are published from her religious confessions for the first time, as Venerabilis Agnetis Blannbekin, but all copies are confiscated by the Jesuits.
The Jesuit father Joseph Henri Marie de Prémare translates a 13th-century Chinese work, The Orphan of Zhao, into French as L'Orphelin de la Maison de Tchao. This makes it the first Chinese play to be translated into any European language.

New books

Prose
Thomas Bayes – Divine Benevolence
Samuel Boyse – Translations and Poems Written on Several Subjects
Ralph Cudworth (died 1688) – A Treatise Concerning Eternal and Immutable Morality
Robert Dodsley 
An Epistle from a Footman in London to the Celebrated Stephen Duck
A Sketch of the Miseries of Poverty
Aaron Hill – Advice to the Poets
Marie Huber – Le Monde fou préféré au monde sage, en vingt-quatre promenades de trois amis, Criton philosophe, Philon avocat, Eraste négociant (The world unmask'd: or, The philosopher the greatest cheat; in twenty-four dialogues between Crito a philosopher, Philo a lawyer, and Erastus, a merchant)
Madame de La Fayette – Memoires de la Cour de France
William Law – The Case of Reason
Pierre de Marivaux – La Vie de Marianne (The Life of Marianne), part one
William Oldys – A Dissertation Upon Pamphlets
Arabella Plantin – Love Led Astray (Or, the Mutual Inconstancy)
Alexander Pope – An Epistle to the Right Honourable Richard Earl of Burlington (also Epistle to Burlington, and to contemporaries as Of False Taste)
Abbé Prévost
Manon Lescaut
Le Philosophe anglais, ou Histoire de Monsieur Cleveland, fils naturel de Cromwell (The Life and Entertaining Adventures of Mr. Cleveland, Natural Son of Oliver Cromwell)
Elizabeth Singer Rowe – Letters Moral and Entertaining
Jean Terrasson – Life of Sethos
Jethro Tull – The New Horse-Houghing Husbandry, or, An essay on the principles of tillage and vegetation wherein is shewn, a method of introducing a sort of vineyard-culture into the corn-fields, to increase their product, and diminish the common expence, by the use of instruments lately invented by Jethro Tull
Diego de Torres Villarroel – Barca de Aqueronte

Drama
Matthew Concanen, Edward Roome, & Sir William Yonge – The Jovial Crew (opera, adapted from Richard Brome's A Jovial Crew)
Theophilus Cibber – The Lover
Charles Coffey & John Mottley – The Devil to Pay (musical adaptation of the play by Thomas Jevon)
Thomas Cooke – The Triumphs of Love and Honour
Henry Fielding
The Tragedy of Tragedies; or, The Life and Death of Tom Thumb
The Letter-Writers
Philip Frowde – Philotas
Aaron Hill – Athelwold
 George Jeffreys – Merope
George Lillo – The London Merchant
David Mallet – Eurydice
James Ralph – The Fall of the Earl of Essex
Lewis Theobald – Orestes
 John Tracy – Periander

Poetry

Nicholas Amhurst (as Caleb D'Anvers) – A Collection of Poems
Jeremy Jingle (pseudonym) – Spiritual Fornication. A burlesque poem. Wherein the case of Miss Cadiere and Father Girard are merrily display'd
Joseph Trapp – The Works of Virgil

Births
February 4 – Mary Deverell, English religious writer, essayist and poet (died 1805)
March 28 – Ramón de la Cruz, Spanish dramatist (died 1794)
November 25 – Gustaf Fredrik Gyllenborg, Swedish writer (died 1808)
November 26 – William Cowper, English poet and cleric (died 1800)
December 12 – Erasmus Darwin, English naturalist, natural philosopher and poet (died 1802)

Deaths
February 20 – Frances Norton, Lady Norton, English poet and religious writer (born c. 1644)
c. April 24 – Daniel Defoe, English novelist and travel writer (born c. 1660)
May 11 – Mary Astell, English protofeminist writer (born 1666)
June 20 – Ned Ward (Edward Ward), English satirist and publican (born 1667)
December 26 – Antoine Houdar de la Motte, French dramatist (born 1672)
unknown date – Mohammed ibn Zakri al-Fasi, Moroccan poet, mystic and theologian (year of birth unknown)

References

 
Years of the 18th century in literature